The 1856 United States presidential election in Delaware took place on November 4, 1856, as part of the 1856 United States presidential election. Voters chose three representatives, or electors to the Electoral College, who voted for president and vice president.

Delaware voted for the Democratic candidate, James Buchanan, over the Republican candidate, John C. Frémont, and the Know Nothing candidate, Millard Fillmore.

Buchanan won the state by a margin of 11.84%.

Results

See also
 United States presidential elections in Delaware

References

Delaware
1856
1856 Delaware elections